The Kunming Open (formerly known as the ATP China International Tennis Challenge – Anning and the Anning Open) is a tennis tournament held in Anning, China since 2012. The women's event first started in 2014, joining the men's Challenger. The event is part of the ATP Challenger Tour and WTA 125 series and is played on clay courts.

Past finals

Men's singles

Women's singles

Men's doubles

Women's doubles

Notes

References

External links
Official website

ATP Challenger Tour
ITF Women's World Tennis Tour
WTA 125 tournaments
Tennis tournaments in China
Clay court tennis tournaments
Hard court tennis tournaments
 
Sport in Kunming
Recurring sporting events established in 2012